Mek or Mek may refer to:
 Mek people, an indigenous tribe of West Papua, Indonesia
 Mek languages, a family of Papuan languages spoken by the Mek peoples
 Mek (comics), a comic mini series by Warren Ellis
 MEK Compound, in Fallujah, Iraq, a compound used by the U.S. military from 2003 to 2009
 Master encryption key, a type of key in cryptography
 Methyl ethyl ketone or butanone, a solvent, used also to weld some plastics
 Mitogen-activated protein kinase kinase, an important enzyme in biochemical MAPK/ERK pathways
 Mu Epsilon Kappa Society, an organization of anime clubs
 Meelo Evaru Koteeswarudu, a Telugu television show
 Magyar Elektronikus Könyvtár or Hungarian Electronic Library, a digital library
 Mojahedin-e Khalq or People's Mujahedin of Iran, an exiled Iranian organization
 Mobile Einsatzkommandos, German police special units
 Mek, variant of Makk, a royal title used in the Sudan

Language and nationality disambiguation pages